Ömer Can Sokullu (born 14 August 1988) is a Turkish footballer who plays as a midfielder for Kırklarelispor.

References

External links
 
 
 
 

1988 births
Sportspeople from Bolu
20th-century Turkish people
21st-century Turkish people
Living people
Turkish footballers
Turkey youth international footballers
Association football midfielders
Pendikspor footballers
İstanbul Başakşehir F.K. players
Karşıyaka S.K. footballers
Ümraniyespor footballers
Sakaryaspor footballers
Kırklarelispor footballers
Süper Lig players
TFF First League players
TFF Second League players